Beverlee McKinsey (August 9, 1935 – May 2, 2008) was an American actress. She is best known for her roles on daytime serials, including Iris Cory Carrington on Another World and the spin-off series Texas from 1972 to 1981 and Alexandra Spaulding on Guiding Light from 1984 to 1992.

Early life
McKinsey was born Beverlee Magruder in McAlester, Oklahoma, on August 9, 1935. She was the daughter of Warren and Jewell Magruder of McAlester.

McKinsey graduated from the University of Oklahoma in 1956 with a bachelor's degree in Drama. Her professional career began in the New York theater. She understudied the leading role of newlywed Corie in the original Broadway production of Barefoot in the Park and was given the opportunity to perform the role opposite Robert Redford several times. She also co-starred as Honey in the London production of Who's Afraid of Virginia Woolf?, starring Uta Hagen and Arthur Hill. She started her career in Off-Broadway theater, often appearing alongside James Earl Jones and Doris Belack.

McKinsey moved to Hollywood in the late 1960s, and after several appearances in episodic television shows, she appeared on daytime TV.  She played Diana Martin, a reporter, on Love of Life, and was then cast in the contract role of Martha Donnelly/Julie Richards (1970–1971) on Love Is a Many Splendored Thing where she worked with future husband Berkeley Harris.

Daytime television career

Iris Carrington

After a brief appearance as Emma Frame on Another World in May 1972, she so impressed then-head writer Harding Lemay that he subsequently cast her in a drastically different role, from dowdy Emma to that of manipulative, scheming Iris Carrington. McKinsey played the role from December 1972 to July 1980. During much of her tenure on Another World, McKinsey's portrayal of Iris was part of an unconventional triangle - the character was trying to break up her father Mackenzie Cory and his new wife, Rachel Davis Frame.

McKinsey's character proved so popular that she was made the star of the soap's spin-off series, Texas, which debuted August 4, 1980. She remains one of two actresses on daytime television to be given a star billing on a soap opera, the other being Rosemary Prinz of All My Children.

After McKinsey left the role of Iris in November 1981, NBC's Texas eventually lost one million viewers in the Nielsen ratings and was canceled in 1982.

McKinsey received four Daytime Emmy nominations for her work as Iris.

Alexandra Spaulding
After a hiatus from daytime, Gail Kobe, then executive producer of Guiding Light, lured McKinsey to Guiding Light, on CBS, in February 1984 in the newly created character of wealthy matriarch Baroness Alexandra Spaulding Von Halkein.

The skilled McKinsey made certain that each of her characters were different. On Another World, Iris would do anything to get whatever she wanted. McKinsey played Iris' desire for her father's approval as the root of her need for power. Iris could be pathetic, sympathetic and a tyrant. As Guiding Light's Alexandra, she played the character's love for power and the desire to best her brother Alan Spaulding. And not to forget her longing for the love, affection, and approval of Lujack/Nick, her twin sons who were forcibly taken away from her at birth. Alexandra also cared deeply for her nephews, Phillip and Alan-Michael.

While Alexandra could be a snob (and ruthless) at times, she also could let her hair down, as when she went bowling with then-beau H.B. Lewis (Larry Gates). Her ruthlessness was revealed when Alexandra married Roger Thorpe (Michael Zaslow) then discovered he was involved in an affair with the younger Mindy Lewis. McKinsey's performance during this storyline evolved from kitten-like sweetness to a tiger-based ferocity that had critics cheering. The scene where Alexandra humiliates Roger in public at the Country Club is now considered a Guiding Light classic scene.

In 1992, McKinsey took advantage of an out in her contract and abruptly left GL. Soap journalist Michael Logan wrote about the turn of events:Interviewing McKinsey was a dream. There were never any "I just love everyone I work with" cliches. After she exited Guiding Light, McKinsey cited her "not very pleasant" work environment for one of the reasons she chose to leave the daytime serial. Looking at her contract, she discovered she could leave the show after every six-month period. So McKinsey took advantage of the contract the day before her annual eight-week vacation. McKinsey went on permanent vacation. McKinsey adamantly defended her choice to exit the show. Her bosses felt they had been bamboozled. "They're bent out of shape because, for once, somebody beat 'em at their own game," she said. "I had warned Jill (the show's then-executive producer Jill Farren Phelps) – although I don't think she paid attention to me – that I was not happy. I was not happy with the story line." She had confided in Phelps previously that she was frustrated enough to quit, and was told in response that perhaps she should read her contract.

McKinsey later quipped that perhaps it was Phelps and the rest of the Guiding Light production team who should have read the contract. "They didn't read the contract! I read it very closely. I knew every word. The next day, they were all combing over the contract. Somebody said, 'Maybe Beverlee's not familiar with the contract.' Well, of course she was! She wrote it, you bozos. She wrote it! I've had this out clause since 1986. I asked for it and it was P&G that determined how much notice they wanted me to give – and they chose eight weeks."

In addition to her issues with storytelling, which she said would not have motivated her to leave if her working environment had been happier, McKinsey noted that acting had simply stopped being fun for her. "The hours just made me crazy. They were too long," she explained.

Personal life and death

She was married three times, and had one son, Scott McKinsey from her marriage to Mark McKinsey. Her son is a director on the soap opera General Hospital (on which she briefly appeared in 1994). 

McKinsey married Berkeley Harris, a co-star from Love Is a Many Splendored Thing, in 1971, and cared for him during his illness from  terminal brain cancer prior to his death in 1984. 

In 1994, she made a brief appearance as Myrna Slaughter on General Hospital. In an interview, she said she took the role to qualify for her medical insurance, but otherwise adamantly considered herself retired from soaps from that moment in 1992 when she last left the set of Guiding Light. She had resisted all entreaties to return to daytime television. After some health issues, including a kidney transplant, McKinsey retired to Southern California and made few public appearances. Michael Logan famously described McKinsey as "[making] Greta Garbo look like a chatterbox!". Logan, TV Guide's soap columnist, once called McKinsey "…the greatest actress ever to grace daytime drama." 

Beverlee McKinsey died on May 2, 2008, at the Olympic Medical Center in Los Angeles, from complications due to a kidney transplant, which she had undergone in 1998.

Filmography

Film

Television

Theatre

Awards and nominations

References

External links
 
 
 
 Beverlee McKinsey Archive
 1992 TV Guide interview with McKinsey
 Irises: The unofficial Beverlee McKinsey and Carmen Duncan home page
 'Iris' character bio from Eddie's AW Home Page
 Clips from Texas episodes
 Beverlee McKinsey Tribute from Respectance.com
 

1935 births
2008 deaths
Actresses from Oklahoma
American soap opera actresses
American stage actresses
People from McAlester, Oklahoma
People from Santa Maria, California
Kidney transplant recipients
20th-century American actresses
21st-century American women